The 2023 Royal London One-Day Cup tournament is scheduled to be a limited overs cricket competition that forms part of the 2023 domestic cricket season in England and Wales. Matches will be contested over 50 overs per side, having List A cricket status, with all eighteen first-class counties competing in the tournament. The tournament is scheduled to start on 1 August 2023, with the final taking place on 16 September 2023 at Trent Bridge in Nottingham. Kent are the defending champions winning the 2022 tournament.

Teams
The teams were placed into the following groups:

 Group A: Essex, Hampshire, Kent, Lancashire, Leicestershire, Middlesex, Nottinghamshire, Surrey, Yorkshire
 Group B: Derbyshire, Durham, Glamorgan, Gloucestershire, Northamptonshire, Somerset, Sussex, Warwickshire, Worcestershire

Group A

Fixtures
Source:

Group B

Fixtures
Source:

Knockout stage
The winner of each group progressed straight to the semi-finals with the second and third placed teams playing a play-off match against a team from the other group which made up the play-offs. The winner of each play-off played one of the group winners in the semi-finals.

Quarter-finals

Semi-finals

Final

References

External links
 Series home at ESPN Cricinfo

Royal London One-Day Cup
Royal London One-Day Cup